is a passenger railway station located in the city of Bizen, Okayama Prefecture, Japan, operated by the West Japan Railway Company (JR West).

Lines

Station layout
The station consists of one side platform serving single bi-directional track.  Because it is located on an embankment, it is quite high from surrounding houses. The station is are located along Japan National Route 2, but the station building and platform are three stories or higher above the surrounding town.

Adjacent stations

History
Nishi-Katakami Station was opened on 1 May 1963. With the privatization of Japanese National Railways (JNR) on 1 April 1987, the station came under the control of JR West.

Passenger statistics
In fiscal 2019, the station was used by an average of 589 passengers daily

Surrounding area
Bizen City Hall
Japan National Route 2
Okayama Prefectural Bizen Ryokuyo High School (former Okayama Prefectural Bizen High School)
Bizen City Katakami High School

See also
List of railway stations in Japan

References

External links

 JR West Station Official Site

Railway stations in Okayama Prefecture
Akō Line
Railway stations in Japan opened in 1963
Bizen, Okayama